Arianna may refer to: 

 Ariana (name), a given name

Opera
 L'Arianna, (English: Arianna), by Monteverdi, first performed 1608
 Arianna (Marcello), by Benedetto Marcello, first concert performance 1727
 Arianna in Creta, by Handel, first performed 1734
 Arianna (Goehr), by Alexander Goehr, first performed 1995

Other uses
Arianna (film), 2015 
ARIANNA Experiment, a proposed neutrino detector at the Ross Ice Shelf, Antarctica
Arianna (yacht), a 2012 luxury megayacht

See also
Ariana (disambiguation)
Ariane (disambiguation)
Ariadne (disambiguation)
Aria (region), sometimes confused with Ariana
Aryana (TV series)